Loredano Ugolini (born 17 December 1927) is an Italian comic artist and illustrator.

Life and career
Born in Florence, Ugolini started his career in 1948, illustrating several book covers for the publisher Salani; there he became friends with the comic artist , a collaborator of the publishing house, who introduced him to the comics publisher .

In the following years Ugolini created and illustrated several series including Lobo Kid (with stories by  Gian Luigi Bonelli, published by Sergio Bonelli Editore), Tony Gagliardo (another collaboration with Mancuso for Intrepido), Rox (with stories written by ), as well as a number of comics for the British publisher Fleetway Publications. His son Simone is also a comics artist.

References

External links
 Loredano Ugolini at Lambiek
  Loredano Ugolini at Guida al Fumetto Italiano 

1927 births
Living people
People from Florence 
Italian comics artists
Italian illustrators